Bonzano is a surname. Notable people with the surname include:

 Albert Bonzano (1905–1985), French rower
 Giovanni Bonzano (1867–1927), Italian cardinal
 Henri Bonzano (1903–1995), French rower